Wind: A Breath of Heart is a visual novel by Japanese game studio Minori. It was first released for Windows on April 19, 2002 with adult content. It was later ported to the Dreamcast and PlayStation 2 by Alchemist in 2003 with the adult content removed. It features voiced dialog for all characters except for the protagonist. It has been adapted into an anime series with thirteen episodes and four special ones (9.5, 10.4, 10.8 and 12.5), four OVAs, and a manga. An English-language fan translation of the visual novel exists.

History
The Windows version of the game went on sale on April 19, 2002. It was followed by the Soyokaze no Okurimono -Wind Pleasurable Box- on December 27, 2002 which featured a 16-minute OVA Christmas Special along with the game. In 2003, the game was released in two different versions with the Dreamcast version going on sale on January 30 and the PlayStation 2 version on December 18. June 2004 saw the first of 3 KSS OVA's go on sale on the 25th and on the 30th, the anime television series officially started to air. On November 5 of the same year, Wind - a breath of heart - Re:gratitude went on sale.

Plot
Makoto was born in Kazune city where he and his sister, Hinata, played with Minamo. After his father's death he and his sister as well as Minamo's family move away. When his family moves for the second time, he gives Minamo a harmonica and the two of them pinky-swear to meet again some day and marry.

The game begins ten years later. Makoto and Hinata return to Kazune and enroll at the High School where Makoto is reunited with Minamo. He learns that many people from the city have unique special powers. Hinata, for example, can jump higher than most 2-story buildings. Minamo can control the wind, Nozomi can create shockwaves with edged weapons, and Wakaba can cure wounds and slow diseases. The town is also home to a long series of murders and mysterious disappearances.

Professor Akihito, Minamo's father, research into the city's mysteries in an attempt to understand what caused these powers to develop, begins a chain of events and it is the player's goal to help Makoto uncover these mysteries while forging bonds with one of the five girls.

Characters

As the main protagonist, Makoto is impulsive but also compassionate towards the pain of others. He often acts without consideration for the consequences, which garners respect and bewilderment from the methodological Hikari.
 (anime only)

She has practiced playing her harmonica for four years hoping for Makoto to return and keep his promise. Unlike Makoto, she takes their childhood promise seriously and wants to marry now that they are older. Throughout the game she is straightforward and assertive about her love for Makoto. Is the real sister of Hinata and Wakaba.
 (game), Miwa Kouzuki (anime)

Makoto's athletic younger sister. Being very active, she commonly follows her brother around or pulls pranks on him. She carries a pair of binoculars which she uses to spy on things, and is fascinated with the blimp that flies over the city each day. She is hyper, and when she gets hurt, angry or confused, her favorite catchphrase is "Unyah~!" She is the real sister of Minamo and Wakaba.
 (game), Ritsuko Kasai (anime)

Nozomi Fujimiya serves tables with her sister Wakaba. She is skilled at Kendo, although she has a weak heart and often needs Wakaba to heal her when she collapses. She loves her sister, but feels guilty that her poor health is a burden. She and Wakaba are adopted siblings.
 (game), Junko Okada (anime)

Gifted with the ability to prophesize the future, she can also heal. Her ardent desire is to improve her abilities so that she can heal her sister's heart condition. She has a shy and compassionate personality. She is the real sister of Minamo and Hinata. She has weak clairvoyance ability.
Voiced by: Sayaka Aoki (anime)

Hikari is the most knowledgeable person about all of the cities mysteries. In the game her route only opens after the four other girls' routes have been cleared. She first forms a relationship with Makoto when he rescues a cat from a tree; although Hikari is content to observe the world from a distance, Makoto's hands-on approach intrigues her.
 
Hikari is skilled with a katana, a good cook, and she enjoys painting the open sky. She tends to distances herself from other people because of a myriad of lies and given reasons; such as that she doesn't want others to get hurt, or that strong people don't need to rely on others. Yet in reality she longs for human interaction, but fears being rejected.
 (game), Riko Hirai (anime)

A friendly history professor. He is Minamo's father and was a close friend to Makoto's parents before they died. He is determined to research the city and apply his knowledge to stop the line of murders and save the city. He is also the true father of Hinata and Wakaba. 

A schoolgirl often seen together with Tsutomu. She wears eyeglasses to negate her ability to see one's true feelings, and she is fond of purchasing tea leaves from Hikari's shop.

Makoto's male friend. He is clumsy and will flirt with any woman.

Staff
Scenario: Masaya Mukai, Nozomu Koga
Music: TWO-FIVE
Opening:Wind
Lyrics:Don Mccow
Music:Tanimoto Maki
Vocal:Hasegawa Megumi
Ending:Tsu-ba-sa
Lyrics:Don Mccow
Music:Tanimoto Maki
Vocal:Watanabe Eimi
Insert:Dream
Lyrics:Don Mccow
Music:Tanimoto Maki
Vocal:Hasegawa Megumi
Additional song on consumer version (Opening, Kasumi Ending):Flow
Lyrics:Hiroki
Music:Hiroki
Vocal:Koduki Miwa
Movie: Makoto Shinkai

Anime

TV series

OVAs

References

External links
Official website 
Dreamcast port official website 
PlayStation 2 port official website 
TV anime official website 
OVA official website 

2002 anime OVAs
2002 video games
2004 anime OVAs
2004 anime television series debuts
2004 manga
Anime television series based on video games
ASCII Media Works manga
Bishōjo games
Dengeki G's Magazine
Drama anime and manga
Dreamcast games
Eroge
Harem anime and manga
Japan-exclusive video games
Odex
OVAs based on video games
PlayStation 2 games
Romance anime and manga
School life in anime and manga
Video games developed in Japan
Visual novels
Windows games
AT-X (TV network) original programming
Alchemist (company) games
HuneX games
Minori (company) games